

The sign of Tanit or sign of Tinnit is an anthropomorph symbol of the Punic goddess Tanit, present on many archaeological remains of the Carthaginian civilization.

The symbol has many variants, but the basic form consists of a disc on top of a triangle, separated by a horizontal line, like a schematic image of a person.

The earliest known sign of Tanit was a pendant revealed in an 11th-century BC building at Megiddo. Other pendants of the sign were revealed in Ashkelon, Tel Michal, Maresha, Sidon and Motya. A coin with the sign and a legend ΦΑΝΗΒΑΛΟΣ (the Phoenician title of the goddess, meaning "the face of Baal (Hammon)") was found in Ashkelon.

The first report about the representations of the sign was in the beginning of the 19th century, on stele unearthed on the site of Carthage. Archaeological excavations have subsequently uncovered representations on other supports such as mosaics or even on ceramics.

The excavations of tophet of Carthage, Sousse and Motya have highlighted the particularly important diffusion of the symbol in the western basin of the Mediterranean Sea, although the few discoveries on primitive Phoenician land may only be due to continued occupation of sites making searches more difficult.

Modern scholars associate the symbol with the goddess Tanit, partner of Ba'al Hammon and the most important goddess in the Punic religion. This identification is widely, but not universally, accepted. The motif may have had an apotropaic purpose, intended to offer protection from the evil eye.

The symbol is used in some contexts in modern Tunisia. For example, it has appeared on the Tanit d'or, the grand prize of the biennial Carthage Film Festival, since its establishment in 1966.

Gallery

See also
Ankh

References 

Religious symbols
Carthaginian mythology